Eight Ball Deluxe is a pinball machine designed by George Christian and released by Bally in 1981. The game features a cue sports theme and was so 
popular that it was produced again in 1984.

Description
The game is the successor of the popular Eight Ball pinball machine from 1977. In Eight Ball Deluxe, Bally added more rules, complicated shot combinations, and speech synthesis. The pinball machine is still very popular today and was followed by the pinball machine Eight Ball Champ in 1985.

Eight Ball Deluxe has two sets of drop targets, one set for the billiard balls 1-7 and 9-15, and four in line drop targets for bonus multiplier. Behind the 1-7 drop targets are stand up targets that spells out 'Deluxe'. Completing these will light one letter in a different 'Deluxe' spelled out on the backglass. If the player spells the last letter of 'Deluxe' on the backglass, the game gives three free games. This feature stays in memory even when the machine is turned off.

Digital versions
Eight Ball Deluxe was released as digital version in 1993 for MS-DOS and Macintosh, co-developed by Amtex and LittleWing (ja) and published by the former. The game was a best seller in Macintosh gaming world and was a 1993 Best Simulation Game Finalist of the Software Publishers Association (USA) awards. Computer Gaming World in 1993 stated that Eight Ball Deluxe "accurately recreates the art, sounds and digitized speech of the original ... gorgeous, playable and realistic", and was the "connoisseur's choice" among four reviewed games.

Eight Ball Deluxe was also available as a licensed table of The Pinball Arcade for PC, iOS, PlayStation 3, PlayStation 4 and Android from August 2016 to June 30, 2018. After this date, this table for any platform was removed due to WMS license expiration.

See also
Big Shot - a pool themed pinball machine by Gottlieb
Cue Ball Wizard - a cue sports themed pinball machine by Gottlieb

References

External links
 
 

1981 pinball machines
Bally pinball machines
Pinball video games
DOS games
Classic Mac OS games
Video games developed in Canada